

Massey Hill Classical High School (MHCHS) is a high school in Fayetteville, Cumberland County, North Carolina. The main building of the Massey Hill Classical High School was built in 1925. It is a two-story brick building on a raised basement in the Classical Revival-style. What is now known as the Science Building was added in 1942 and eventually expanded to twelve classrooms.  The gymnasium was built in 1947. The gymnasium has served as a community recreation center and is still used by the Recreation Department for evening basketball.

In 2004 Massey Hill was entered in the National Register of Historic Places by the United States Department of the Interior.

List of principals 
 Joyce Adams (1998–2003)
 Donna Hancock (2003–2006)
 Mark Culbreth (2006–2012)
 Pamela Adams (2012–2019)
 Jason Jordan (2019–2021)
 Ann-Marie Palmer (2021–2022)
 Douglas Massengill (2022-Present)

References

External links 
 School website

Public high schools in North Carolina
Education in Fayetteville, North Carolina
Schools in Cumberland County, North Carolina
School buildings on the National Register of Historic Places in North Carolina
Neoclassical architecture in North Carolina
School buildings completed in 1925
Buildings and structures in Fayetteville, North Carolina
National Register of Historic Places in Cumberland County, North Carolina
1925 establishments in North Carolina